238th Street may refer to the following New York City Subway stations in the Bronx:

238th Street station, at Broadway serving the  train
Nereid Avenue station, formerly East 238th Street, at White Plains Road serving the  trains